Suzana Jovanović (born 1 November 1969) is a Serbian pop-folk singer. Jovanović started singing in 1994 when she released her first album Poslaću ti ljubav (I'll Send You Love) for Juvekomerc.

However her first hits such as "Plakala bih i bez suza", "Džabe care", "Didarla" and "Sokole" were released during the end of the 1990s and the beginning of the 2000s. She recorded several successful duets with artists such as Jašar Ahmedovski, as well as being a backing vocalist together with Nataša Đorđević for another famous Serbian singer Stoja.

She is married to Saša Popović, the co-owner of Grand Production.

Discography
Nekad si mi bio nada (1992)
Rođeni u pravo vreme (1994)
Poslaću ti ljubav (1995)
Ko me jednom prevari (1996)
Plakala bih i bez suza (1997)
Didarla (1998)
Prsten sudbine (1999)
Blago za robiju (2001)
Ne izlazi sunce zbog tebe (2002)
Ludilo  (2010)

References

Living people
Musicians from Smederevo
Serbian turbo-folk singers
21st-century Serbian women singers
Grand Production artists
1969 births
20th-century Serbian women singers